Mexico competed at the 2022 Winter Olympics in Beijing, China, from 4 to 20 February 2022.

Mexico's team consisted of four athletes (three men and one woman) competing in three sports.

Alpine skier Sarah Schleper and figure skater Donovan Carrillo were selected as the Mexican flagbearers during the opening ceremony. Meanwhile alpine skier Rodolfo Dickson was the flagbearer during the closing ceremony.

Competitors
The following is the list of number of competitors participating at the Games per sport/discipline.

Alpine skiing

By meeting the basic qualification standards Mexico qualified one male and one female alpine skier.

Cross-country skiing

By meeting the basic qualification standards, Mexico has qualified one male cross-country skier.

Distance

Figure skating

In the 2021 World Figure Skating Championships in Stockholm, Sweden, Mexico secured one quota in the men's competition. Donovan Carrillo would go on to finish in 22nd place overall.

Singles

References

Nations at the 2022 Winter Olympics
2022
2022 in Mexican sports